Wellington (Somerset) is a former county constituency in the United Kingdom, formally known as The Western or Wellington Division of Somerset. It returned one Member of Parliament (MP) to the House of Commons of the Parliament of the United Kingdom, elected by the first past the post voting system, from 1885 until 1918.

History

Creation
The constituency was created by the Redistribution of Seats Act 1885, and elected its first MP at the 1885 general election. It consisted of part of the previous West Somerset division, a two-member constituency which had existed between 1867 and 1885.

Boundaries
The constituency consisted of the western end of the county of Somerset, stretching to the suburbs of Taunton, and was predominantly rural and agricultural. Wellington, though the largest town, contributed only about an eighth of the population; other small towns within the division were Minehead, Watchet, Wiveliscombe, Dunster, Dulverton, Williton and Bishop's Lydeard. Although Taunton was a borough electing an MP in its own right, the franchise rules that applied in the 1885–1918 period allowed freeholders in boroughs to qualify for a vote in the adjoining county division as if the borough did not exist, and the Taunton freeholders were a significant presence in the Wellington constituency.

By the time of the First World War, the population of the constituency was about 50,000, rather below the national average.

Political character
The chief occupation of the population was farming of various types - sheep farming on Exmoor, dairy farming in the Vale of Taunton and arable crops elsewhere - which would have made the constituency naturally Conservative, although the slate quarries around Wellington and Williton would be likely to provide some Liberal voters. But more significant, perhaps, was the influence of the local landowning families, the Luttrells and the Aclands, both of whom were Liberal. This was sufficient to swing the constituency to the Liberals in 1885, but at the next election it was won by the Conservatives, and from 1892 their hold was secured by the choice of Sir Alexander Fuller Acland-Hood as their candidate (he being a relative of the Aclands but a Conservative) - after his initial victory in 1892, the Liberals did not even put up a candidate against him at the next three general elections, and he was returned unopposed. By the time of his elevation to a peerage in 1911, the Wellington division could be regarded as a relatively safe Conservative seat.

Abolition
The constituency was abolished with effect from the 1918 general election, its voters being divided between the new Taunton and Bridgwater county constituencies.

Members of Parliament

Elections

Elections in the 1880s

Elections in the 1890s

Elections in the 1900s

Elections in the 1910s 

General Election 1914–15:

Another General Election was required to take place before the end of 1915. The political parties had been making preparations for an election to take place and by July 1914, the following candidates had been selected; 
Unionist: Dennis Boles
Liberal: Charles Humble Dudley Ward

See also
List of former United Kingdom Parliament constituencies
Unreformed House of Commons

References 

 The Constitutional Year Book for 1913 (London: National Union of Conservative and Unionist Associations, 1913)
 Michael Kinnear, The British Voter (London: BH Batsford, Ltd, 1968)
 Henry Pelling, Social Geography of British Elections 1885-1910 (London: Macmillan, 1967)
 Frederic A Youngs, jr, Guide to the Local Administrative Units of England, Vol I (London: Royal Historical Society, 1979)

Parliamentary constituencies in Somerset (historic)
Constituencies of the Parliament of the United Kingdom established in 1885
Constituencies of the Parliament of the United Kingdom disestablished in 1918
Taunton Deane